Joseph Michael Armstrong (born 29 January 1939) is an English former footballer who played as an inside forward.

Armstrong started his career with Leslie Boys Club before joining Leeds United in 1957. He moved on to Gateshead in 1959 without making an appearance for Leeds United. Armstrong made 23 appearances for Gateshead in the league and FA Cup, scoring 10 goals.

Sources

1939 births
English footballers
Association football forwards
Leeds United F.C. players
Gateshead F.C. players
English Football League players
Living people
Gateshead A.F.C. players